Alfred George Owen (1880–unknown) was an English footballer who played in the Football League for West Bromwich Albion.

References

1880 births
English footballers
Association football forwards
English Football League players
West Bromwich Albion F.C. players
Walsall F.C. players
Year of death missing